The Wooden Lake is a reservoir in the Almaty Region of Kazakhstan. The reservoir was formed presumably at the end of the nineteenth century, or at the beginning of the last century. The westernmost branch of the Sharyn river is supported by sand moving from the river, so the trees end up in the water. Hence the name of the lake – "Wooden".

History
Lake-is a mystery and is located in the left channel of the Sharyn river below the village of Sharyn and hides in the sand and reeds, near the mouth of the Sharyn River. The road to the lake is not easy to find. From the South and East, the lake is approached by salt marshes, swamps and turang groves. Once on its banks, you realize that this is not a desert Mirage, but a real oasis in the hot semi-desert. The shores of the lake are sandy, with magnificent beaches and extensive reeds. The abundance of healing mud in shallow water and hot sun contributes to the popularity of the local population, who consider the lake healing.

Description
From the height of the dunes, you can see in the North the magnificent Aktau mountains (White mountains) located on the opposite Bank of the Ili river, on the territory of the state National natural Park "Altyn-Emel". Surrounded from the West and North by the advancing Sands of the Karabaskum desert, from the East and South by tugai and turang thickets, the lake, having no flow, has become an excellent habitat for plants and animals. The water world is represented by carp, carp, white Cupid, catfish. In General, the same fish that lives in the Sharyn and Ili rivers.
It is known that in the reeds and poplar up to 30-ies of the last century on the banks of the "Wooden" lake was inhabited by the Turanian tiger. And now there are boars, foxes, hares. Occasionally come the wolves. There are a lot of birds: ducks, geese, herons, cranes.
The climate in these places is continental. Winter is moderately mild, with a stable snow cover. The average temperature in January is -4 °C. there Are often frosts up to -40 °C. the Summer is hot, the average temperature in July is + 28 °C. Sometimes the air temperature rises to +45 °C. Precipitation falls up to 300 mm per year, mainly in spring and autumn.
The life of the Wooden lake is short-lived, the reason for its disappearance will be sand. The desert encroaches on the lake, gradually absorbing it, and years will pass, the lake will disappear, leaving numerous dried-up trunks of sand-choked trees on the shore. And the lake will be reborn, and will again fight the advancing desert.
Lake Derevyannoye is located in the left channel of the Sharyn river, on the left Bank of the Ili river, in the Uyghur district of Almaty region, 280 km from Almaty. The lake is located 7 kilometers from the village of Sharyn and 12 kilometers from the highway. Travelers traveling by car are advised not to visit the lake during a downpour — the road in the salt marshes will become impassable.
The monument has a favorable acoustic environment (silence, melodic sounds in nature). You can go to the lake all year round. Of course, if you plan to go fishing or hunting.

Legend
Stormy Sharyn was in a hurry to bring his water to Ili. Nothing could prevent its rapid flow. Along the way, Sharyn cut deep canyons, and, washing away the clay banks, a muddy stream rushed to the intended goal. Nothing seemed to stop him. But decided to try him on the power of the desert Karabasan. It began to advance on the wayward river and was able to cut off one of the branches from it, blocking its further path with sand dunes. The water spread, flooding the surrounding banks with turang groves, and formed a lake that people called Wooden. But Sharyn still brought its main waters to the Ili river.

References

Sources of information about the monument
 Marikovsky P. I. The Fate Of Charyn. Almaty: Foundation "XXI century", 1997.-120
 Luterovich O. G. Three popular excursions in Semirechye: a guide, Almaty: "Service Press", 2016.- 92c.
 Maryashev Monuments of Semirechye archeology and their use in excursions-Almaty, 2002

Lakes of Kazakhstan